Karl Gerstner (2 July 1930 – 1 January 2017) was a Swiss designer, typographer, author, and artist.

Career 
Gerstner attended Allgemeine Gewerbeschule Basel.

From 1944 to 1948, Gerstner apprenticed as a typographer for artist Fritz Bühler's studio, alongside graphic designer Armin Hofmann, in Basel, Switzerland.

His supervisor at Bühler's studio, Max Schmid, later went on to work at the Geigy chemical company. In 1949, Gerstner began freelancing for Geigy after Schmid recruited him. 

In 1958, he and Markus Kutter formed Gerstner+Kutter advertising agency in Basel. In 1962, they partnered with Paul Gredinger, and Gerstner+Kutter became GGK (Gerstner, Gredinger + Kutter), a leading Swiss advertising agency. 

In 2006 Gerstner donated his entire archive to the Swiss National Library in Bern, and the Karl Gerstner Archive sets out to document his design process from the earliest drafts to the final product.

Gerstner died in Basel University Hospital on 1 January 2017.

Exhibitions 
designing programs/programming designs by Karl Gerstner was a solo exhibition on view from February 5 to March 30 1973 at the Museum of Modern Art, New York directed by Emilio Ambasz. The exhibition was based on Gerstner's book Designing Programms.

Typefaces 

Gerstner Programm was designed by Karl Gerstner between 1964-67 and first published in Berthold's Diatype filmsetting format. 16 versions of the programme were generated, 8 regular and 8 italic, using the Sinar camera under the expert direction of GGK staff member Werner Richli. Templates were executed by Christian Mengelt. It was successful in the U.S., where it was issued by Aaron Burns, but soon perished with the Diatype system.

A digital restoration by Stephan Müller of Gerstner Programm has been released in 2017.

Bibliography

References

External links
Obituary on form.de
Karl Gerstner Archive

1930 births
2017 deaths
Swiss typographers and type designers
Swiss designers
Swiss contemporary artists